Thomas Guida Currigan (July 8, 1920 – December 27, 2014) was Auditor of Denver, Colorado, from 1955 to 1963 and Denver Democratic Party Mayor from 1963 to 1968.

Currigan was the grandson of Martin D. Currigan. He graduated from University of Notre Dame in 1941. He joined the military in 1942 during the World War II era and was discharged as a captain in the United States Air Force in 1946. He worked for Remington Rand Company. He died on December 27, 2014, at a nursing home in Chicago, Illinois, aged 94.

See also
Mayors of Denver
Corrigan (surname)

References

External links

 Curren to Currivan, the Political Graveyard
 

1920 births
2014 deaths
Mayors of Denver
Colorado Democrats
University of Notre Dame alumni
United States Army Air Forces officers
American municipal police chiefs
United States Army Air Forces personnel of World War II